Russfin Airport  is an airport serving the Timaukel commune of the Magallanes y Antártica Chilena Region of Chile.

See also

Transport in Chile
List of airports in Chile

References

External links
OpenStreetMap - Russfin
FallingRain - Russfin Airport
World Airport Codes - Russfin

Airports in Chile
Airports in Tierra del Fuego Province, Chile